V'iacheslav Hryhorovych Kulida (born January 22, 1970 in Kherson) is a Ukrainian sprint canoer who competed in the mid-1990s. He was eliminated in the semifinals of the K-4 1000 m event at the 1996 Summer Olympics in Atlanta.

References
 Sports-Reference.com profile

1970 births
Canoeists at the 1996 Summer Olympics
Living people
Olympic canoeists of Ukraine
Ukrainian male canoeists
Sportspeople from Kherson